"We Owned the Night" is a song recorded by American country music trio Lady Antebellum.  It was released in August 2011 as the second single from their album Own the Night.  The song was co-written by (Charles Kelley and Dave Haywood) along with Dallas Davidson, and it features lead vocals from Kelley.

Background
Charles Kelley and Dave Haywood wrote the song with Dallas Davidson. The title started during a conversation that Kelley had with his and Davidson's wives at a bar, telling them that they should "own the night" and stay longer at the bar. After hearing Lady Antebellum perform another uptempo song with a mandolin, Davidson suggested that Haywood and Kelley should "capture that same energy, and write a big hit song on the mandolin." Haywood then began playing the mandolin. Davidson said that he wanted the song to "dive into a deeper lyric, take it to a place a little more serious[…]but keep it light and keep it fun".

In the song, a man recalls a brief but memorable romantic encounter with a woman who he has not seen since. The song is in the key of D-flat major with an approximate tempo of 96 beats per minute. The song consists of four verses plus a bridge in between verses three and four. Its main chord pattern for each verse is D-G-Em-D, with all but the first verse ending in Kelley singing "yeah, we owned the night" over the pattern Bm-G-D. In the bridge, the chord pattern is Em-G twice, followed by another E minor chord before returning to a final verse which uses the same pattern as verses two and three. The title phrase is then repeated one last time. All guitars in the song are tuned to E-flat tuning.

Critical reception
Robbie Daw of Idolator commented that "once again, the country act serves up a pop-crossover jam that should appeal to a variety of listeners, and will no doubt find a home on an array of radio format playlists." Billy Dukes of Taste of Country gave the song a four and a half stars rating out of five. He explained "‘We Owned the Night’ is rootsy, something that couldn’t be said about any of the group’s previous singles. This being their third album, it was wise to take a chance sonically to avoid fan fatigue. The trio still manages to hang on to the lyrical suspense that makes their music so captivating." He concluded saying "This song is like Lady A with no makeup on, in beat up blue jeans and their collective hair pulled back in a ponytail. It’s a new style that’s still familiar, but sexy in its own way."

The song won the British Country Music Association (BCMA) award for International Song of the Year in 2012.

Music video
The music video for "We Owned the Night" shows two couples on a date. At the end the couples end up at a gathering, everyone is dancing together, and there is a fireworks display at the end. Everyone is in a circle with Lady Antebellum performing in the middle.  It was directed by Shaun Silva and shot in Nashville.

Chart performance

Year-end charts

Certifications

Release history

References

2011 singles
2011 songs
Lady A songs
Songs written by Charles Kelley
Songs written by Dave Haywood
Songs written by Dallas Davidson
Music videos directed by Shaun Silva
Capitol Records Nashville singles